Blind Date is a 1996 Dutch film by director Theo van Gogh.

In 1996, the film was nominated for four Golden Calves at the Netherlands Film Festival and won three.

In 2007, Stanley Tucci released a remake of the film.

External links

1996 films
Films directed by Theo van Gogh
1996 drama films
1990s Dutch-language films
Dutch drama films